Park Jung-soo (also known as Park Jung-su) (born June 1, 1953) is a South Korean actress. Park made her acting debut in 1972 and became best known for starring in television dramas, notably Love and Farewell (1993), Way of Living: Woman (1994), LA Arirang (1995), Why Can't We Stop Them (2000), Rose Fence (2003), and Living in Style (2011).

In 2005, she published her autobiography Park Jung-soo's Inner Beauty, which was also a style guide for women in their fifties.

Filmography

Film

Television series

Variety show

Theater

Book

Awards and nominations

References

External links 
 Park Jungsu at Jellyfish Entertainment
 
 
 

1953 births
Jellyfish Entertainment artists
Living people
South Korean television actresses
South Korean film actresses